The Bill Murray EP is an EP released by Canadian hip hop group Sweatshop Union on March 1, 2011.

Track listing
 "Intro" - 0:41
 "Makeshift Kingdom" - 3:01
 "Sunburn" - 2:37
 "Bring Back the Music (feat. D-Sisive)" - 3:17
 "Nuclear Family" - 3:42
 "Bill Murray" - 2:59
 "John Lennon" - 2:49
 "Staring at the Walls (Too Late)" - 3:57

Reception
The Bill Murray EP was well received by critics. It won "Best Rap/Hiphop Recording" at the 2011 Western Canadian Music Awards.

Personnel 
Credits for The Bill Murray EP adapted from liner notes.

 Conscience - Writer, Production, 
 Metty The Dert Merchant - Writer, Production
 Mos Eisley - Writer, Production
 Dusty - Writer, Production
 Marmalade - Writer, Production
 D-Sisive - Writer, Featured Artist
 Preme Diesel - Writer, Production, Programming
 Dave Knill - Writer, Production, Programming
 Jamie Kuse - Engineer, Production, Mixing
 DJ Itchy Ron - Scratching

References

2011 EPs
Sweatshop Union albums